Elsa Björklund (14 January 1895 – 15 May 1970) was a Swedish swimmer. She competed in the 100 metre freestyle event at the 1912 Summer Olympics, but failed to reach the final.

References

External links
 

1895 births
1970 deaths
Olympic swimmers of Sweden
Swimmers at the 1912 Summer Olympics
Swimmers from Stockholm
Stockholms KK swimmers
Swedish female freestyle swimmers